The Danish League Cup, was a football competition, arranged by Divisionsforeningen, for all the top level Danish football teams. The competition has existed in various formats, with the exact name of the league depending on the sponsor. For instance, the Danish League Cup was named Carlsberg Grand Prix in 1984, where Brøndby IF won the trophy. While the name changed to Spar Cup in 1996, where FC Copenhagen won the trophy. The last time the League Cup was organised as an official tournament was apparently in 1996. It shortly reappeared in 2005-2006, as the tournament known as Tele2 LigaCup. Games played in the Tele2 LigaCup were however not counted as official matches by the Danish Football Association, as the matches were only played with one regular half (45 minutes). The Tele2 LigaCup also had a limited representation of clubs, as the format was just a round-robin tournament between the top 3 finishers of the Danish Superliga.

Selected finals

Total titles

League Cup
National association football league cups
Recurring sporting events established in 2005
2005 establishments in Denmark
Recurring sporting events disestablished in 2006
2006 disestablishments in Denmark